Iceland's first ambassador to Austria was Árni Tryggvason in 1965. Iceland's current ambassador to Austria is Auðunn Atlason.

List of ambassadors

See also
Foreign relations of Iceland
Ambassadors of Iceland

References
List of Icelandic representatives (Icelandic Foreign Ministry website) 

1965 introductions
Main
Austria
Iceland